Bent Nørregaard-Jensen (born 2 December 1949) is a former international speedway rider from Denmark.

Speedway career 
Nørregaard-Jensen was Danish champion in 1974 after winning the Danish Individual Speedway Championship. He was also the Danish Junior Champion in 1967.

He reached the final of the Speedway World Pairs Championship in the 1969 Speedway World Pairs Championship and the 1970 Speedway World Pairs Championship.

He rode in the top tier of British Speedway in 1969, riding for West Ham Hammers.

World Final appearances

World Pairs Championship
 1969 -  Stockholm (with Ole Olsen) - 4th - 15pts (4)
 1970 -  Malmö (with Ole Olsen) - NC (Track Reserve) - 17pts (5)

World Longtrack Championship
 1971 -  Oslo 5th 12pts
 1972 –  Mühldorf 5th 17pts
 1973 -  Oslo 15th 2 pts

References 

1949 births
Living people
Danish speedway riders
West Ham Hammers riders
People from Vejen Municipality
Sportspeople from the Region of Southern Denmark